Paweł Zbigniew Kurczewski (17 August 1950 – 13 December 2009) was a Polish wrestler who competed in the 1972 Summer Olympics and in the 1976 Summer Olympics. He was born in Łódź.

References

External links
 

1951 births
2009 deaths
Olympic wrestlers of Poland
Wrestlers at the 1972 Summer Olympics
Wrestlers at the 1976 Summer Olympics
Polish male sport wrestlers
Sportspeople from Łódź